Michael Linklater (born September 25, 1982) is a Canadian basketball player. He plays for the Saskatchewan Rattlers. He is a Nehiyaw (Cree). Linklater is the recipient of the 2018 Tom Longboat Award, which recognizes  Aboriginal athletes "for their outstanding contributions to sport in Canada".

Early life 

Linklater was born in Trenton, New Jersey on September 25, 1982. He is a Nehiyaw (Cree) and a descendant of  the Thunderchild First Nation, located on Treaty 6 Territory. Linklater was raised by his great aunt Maria, and her husband, Walter, who became his legal guardians in Thunder Bay, Ontario. At age 10, both he and his guardians moved to Saskatoon. At 16, he legally changed his last name to Linklater, matching his legal guardians.  

Linklater learned how to play basketball in grade school. He attended an inner-city school and was exposed to alcohol and drug abuse from an early age in both his community and in his extended family. His birth mother struggled with drug and alcohol addiction, both of his grandparents died of alcoholism and his half-brother lost his life in his early 20s.   

His guardians created a spiritual and safe home environment and, from an early age, Linklater often participated in cultural ceremonies. At age 11, Linklater made a pact with himself to abstain from drugs and alcohol in order to challenge the stereotype that all indigenous peoples are alcoholics.

In elementary school, Linklater set three goals for himself: to play basketball for a post-secondary institution, to play basketball professionally and to play for Team Canada. He accomplished all three.

Linklater attended Mount Royal Collegiate. He won Athlete of the Year in grades 9 through 11, competed on both the track & field and the cross country teams, and captained both the football and basketball teams. After graduating from Mount Royal, he attended junior college at the United Tribes Technical College in Bismarck, North Dakota, where he played basketball.  

For his second year of post-secondary eligibility, Linklater moved back to Saskatoon to attend the University of Saskatchewan. Afterwards, he returned to take classes in the Nutrition program at Southern Alberta Institute of Technology (SAIT) in Calgary. After a year off due to an injury, Linklater transferred to Lakeland College in Lloydminster, Alberta, where he again played basketball. He finished his post-secondary playing career at the University of Saskatchewan where, in 2009-10, the basketball team won its only CanWest Conference Championship and Canadian Intercollegiate Sport (now USport) National Championship under his captaincy.

Career 
Linklater played for the Edmonton Energy of the International Basketball League. He entered and won a 3-on-3 tournament in Edmonton, advancing with his team to the World Tour Finals in Istanbul where they finished sixth.   

Linklater is ranked as one of Canada’s best 3-on-3 basketball players. As a captain of Team Saskatoon, he participated in several FIBA 3x3 World Tour Finals and joined the 3-on-3 world tour in 2012. Three-on-three basketball makes its Olympic debut in 2020 in Tokyo.

Advocacy 
Linklater founded a campaign called Boys With Braids  to raise awareness of the cultural significance of braided hair as worn by indigenous boys and men. Through creating this campaign, his aim is to educate all on the importance and significance of indigenous traditions. He founded Prime Basketball Development, which engages with Indigenous communities. Prime Basketball Development holds clinics and educates indigenous youth in both basketball and the importance of living a healthy and sober lifestyle.

Awards

Linklater has been the recipient of awards for his work as an advocate for Indigenous youth and his community involvement. These include:

 Saskatchewan CBC future 40 under 40
 Chief of Police award for community service
 Circle of Honour for Sport
 Sasktel Aboriginal Youth Award of Excellence
 Indspire Award, in the sport category (2018)
 Tom Longboat Award (2018), in the men’s category, awarded to Aboriginal athletes for their outstanding contributions to sport in Canada.

References

First Nations sportspeople
Indspire Awards
Saskatchewan Rattlers players
1982 births
Living people